is a train station in Mikawachi-Hon-Machi, Sasebo, Nagasaki Prefecture, Japan. It is operated by JR Kyushu and is on the Sasebo Line.

Lines
Only Sasebo Line local services stop at this station.

Station layout 
The station, which is unstaffed, consists of two side platforms serving two tracks with a siding branching off track 2. The station building is a small wooden structure which houses a ticket window but which is presently unstaffed. Access to the opposite side platform is by means of a footbridge.

Adjacent stations

History
In the next phase of expansion, the track was extended further west with Haiki opening as the new western terminus on 10 July 1897. Mikawachi was opened on the same day as an intermediate station on the new track. When the Kyushu Railway was nationalized on 1 July 1907, Japanese Government Railways (JGR) took over control of the station. On 12 October 1909, station became part of the Nagasaki Main Line. On 1 December 1934, another route was given the designation Nagasaki Main Line and track serving the station was redesignated the Sasebo Line. With the privatization of Japanese National Railways (JNR), the successor of JGR, on 1 April 1987, control of the station passed to JR Kyushu.

Passenger statistics
In fiscal 2014, there were a total of 30,338 boarding passengers, giving a daily average of 83 passengers.

Environs
National Route 35
Mikawachi Hospital
Mikawachi Post Office
Sasebo City Office Mikawachi Branch

See also
 List of railway stations in Japan

References

External links
Mikawachi Station (JR Kyushu)

Railway stations in Nagasaki Prefecture
Railway stations in Japan opened in 1897
Sasebo Line
Sasebo